Muhammad Fiaz is a Canadian politician, who was elected to the Legislative Assembly of Saskatchewan in the 2016 provincial election, and was re-elected in the 2020 election.  He represents the electoral district of Regina Pasqua as a member of the Saskatchewan Party.

Fiaz is the first Muslim to be elected to the provincial legislature in Saskatchewan's history.

References

Living people
Saskatchewan Party MLAs
Politicians from Regina, Saskatchewan
21st-century Canadian politicians
Canadian politicians of Pakistani descent
Pakistani emigrants to Canada
Naturalized citizens of Canada
Year of birth missing (living people)